Khulekani Walter Kubheka (born 7 January 1999), is a South African soccer player who currently plays as a goalkeeper for the Mamelodi Sundowns.

Career statistics

Club

Notes

References

1999 births
Living people
South African soccer players
Association football goalkeepers
National First Division players
Bidvest Wits F.C. players
Mamelodi Sundowns F.C. players
South Africa under-20 international soccer players